Euseius papayana is a species of mite in the family Phytoseiidae.

References

papayana
Articles created by Qbugbot